The Henry Wohlers Sr. Homestead, also known as "Dutch Henry" Wohlers Homestead, was listed on the National Register of Historic Places in 2004. The property includes four contributing buildings and one other contributing structure.

It includes a brick house built  1890, a two-story addition built in 1910, and a barn built in 1914.  It also includes a washhouse, a chicken coop, and a windmill.

In 2010, the property was operated as Pine Ridge Hunting and Lodging.

References

External links

Prairie School architecture
Buildings and structures completed in 1890
National Register of Historic Places in Dawes County, Nebraska